Álvaro Fillol (born 4 December 1952), is a former professional tennis player from Chile.  He enjoyed most of his tennis success while playing doubles.  During his career he won 5 doubles titles. He is the younger brother of tennis player Jaime Fillol, and the great-uncle of Nicolás Jarry.

Career finals

Doubles (5 titles, 2 runner-ups)

References

External links
 
 

Chilean male tennis players
Tennis players from Santiago
1952 births
Living people
Tennis players at the 1975 Pan American Games
Pan American Games competitors for Chile
20th-century Chilean people
21st-century Chilean people